Democratic Independent Regionalist Party (PRI) was a Chilean centrist political party. It was formed by the merger of the Independent Regionalist Party (PRI) and the Patagonian Regional Democracy (DRP).

The party was part of the centre-right coalition Chile Vamos and supported the government of President Sebastián Piñera.

In 2019 the PRI suffered an internal dispute after Hugo Ortiz de Filippi defeated Eduardo Salas in the elections. After this, a group of militants left the party to form another called New Middle Class.

The party lost official registration after failing to get a minimum percentage of the vote in the 2021 elections.

Presidential candidates 
The following is a list of the presidential candidates supported by the Democratic Independent Regionalist Party. (Information gathered from the Archive of Chilean Elections). 
2021: Sebastián Sichel (lost)

Electoral history

Congress election

References

External links
 Official site

Political parties established in 2018
Political parties disestablished in 2022
Political parties in Chile
2018 establishments in Chile
Centrist parties in South America